Joseph Jason Namakaeha Momoa (born August 1, 1979) is an American actor. He made his acting debut as Jason Ioane on the syndicated action drama series Baywatch: Hawaii (1999–2001), which was followed by portrayals of Ronon Dex on the Syfy science fiction series Stargate Atlantis (2005–2009), Khal Drogo in the first two seasons of the HBO fantasy drama series Game of Thrones (2011–2012), Declan Harp on the Discovery Channel historical drama series Frontier (2016–2018), and Baba Voss on the Apple TV+ science fiction series See (2019–2022). Momoa was featured as the lead of the latter two series.

Since 2016, Momoa has portrayed Aquaman in the DC Extended Universe (DCEU), first appearing in a cameo in the film Batman v Superman: Dawn of Justice (2016) and then in Justice League (2017) and its 2021 director's cut, headlining in Aquaman (2018) and its 2023 sequel Aquaman and the Lost Kingdom, as well as a cameo in the TV series Peacemaker (2022–present). Momoa also played Duncan Idaho in the 2021 film adaptation of the science fiction novel Dune.

Early life
An only child, Momoa was born on August 1, 1979, in Honolulu, Hawaii, to Coni (Lemke), a photographer, and Joseph Momoa, a painter. His father is of Native Hawaiian ancestry and his mother is of German, Irish and  Pawnee heritage ancestry. Shortly after his birth, his parents divorced and he and his mother moved to Norwalk, Iowa where he was raised. He graduated from Norwalk High School where he was part of the soccer team alongside Brandon Routh. He attended the University of Hawaii.

Career

At 19 years old, while living and working in Honolulu, Momoa decided to audition for the television series Baywatch Hawaii, in which he was cast as Jason Ioane (1999–2001).

In addition to his appearances in Johnson Family Vacation (2004) and Stargate: Atlantis (2005–2009), Momoa was cast as Roman in four episodes of the comedy-drama television series The Game (2009). He portrayed the title protagonist in Conan the Barbarian (2011), a reimagining of the 1982 film of the same name and a role made famous by Arnold Schwarzenegger. Momoa gained his role of Khal Drogo on HBO's Game of Thrones through his audition, in which he performed a Haka, one of many intimidating Māori dances traditionally used to convey a challenge to an opponent, or a welcome to a visitor.

Momoa directed and co-wrote Road to Paloma (2014), an American drama thriller film, together with writers Jonathan Hirschbein and Robert Homer Mollohan. The film stars Momoa, Sarah Shahi, Lisa Bonet, Michael Raymond-James, and Wes Studi. It premiered at the 2014 Sarasota Film Festival in April 2014. The film had a limited theatrical release on July 15, 2014, in New York City and Los Angeles and a VOD release.

In March 2014, Momoa joined the dark comedy/thriller indie Sugar Mountain alongside Cary Elwes and Haley Webb; its principal photography was done in Alaska. He also starred as Phillip Kopus, a Ramapough Mountain Indian, on the SundanceTV drama series The Red Road (2014–2015).

In June 2014, Momoa was reported to have been cast in the role of Arthur Curry / Aquaman, after he auditioned for Bruce Wayne / Batman. He first played the role in a cameo in the superhero film Batman v Superman: Dawn of Justice, marking Aquaman's live action film debut. Momoa played the character in a leading role in the 2017 ensemble film Justice League and its director's cut; Zack Snyder's Justice League. He then starred in the Aquaman solo film, which was released in late 2018. He also reprised this role in The Lego Movie 2: The Second Part.

In August 2014, Momoa portrayed Connor in the Canadian horror action film Wolves, and starred in the Sci-fi horror movie Debug; it was written and directed by Momoa's former Stargate Atlantis co-star, British-born Canadian actor David Hewlett. In February 2015, it was announced that he would portray a cannibal in the drama thriller film The Bad Batch. In 2015, Momoa was cast in the Canadian action film Braven, which was released on February 2, 2018.

In March 2017, it was announced that Momoa would play Rico Rodriguez in the official Just Cause film series.

Between 2016 and 2018, Momoa portrayed Declan Harp in all three seasons of the Canadian historical drama television series Frontier and was an executive producer on the show. The series chronicles the North American fur trade in late 1700s Canada, and follows Declan Harp, a part-Irish, part-Cree outlaw who is campaigning to breach the Hudson's Bay Company's monopoly on the fur trade in Canada, which has become corrupt and engages in illegal activities to enrich itself.

In July 2018, Momoa was cast for Apple's post-apocalyptic drama series See.

In February 2019, Momoa was cast as Duncan Idaho in the Denis Villeneuve film Dune.

In February 2020, Momoa appeared in a halftime commercial for Rocket Mortgage for Super Bowl LIV. He also appeared in the teaser for "Scary Little Green Men" by Ozzy Osbourne from his album Ordinary Man.

In January 2022, it was announced that Momoa joined the cast of the tenth Fast & Furious film titled Fast X as the main villain, Dante Reyes, the son of Hernan Reyes (Joaquim de Almeida), the main antagonist killed by Luke Hobbs (Dwayne Johnson) in Fast Five. Fast X is produced by and stars Vin Diesel.

In April 2022, it was announced that Momoa will star in the film adaptation of Minecraft, with Jared Hess directing.

Personal life

Momoa met his first fiancee, actress Simmone Jade Mackinnon, on the set of Baywatch in 1999. They were together for 6 years and became engaged in 2004. Mackinnon and Momoa called off their engagement after Momoa began a relationship with actress Lisa Bonet in 2005. Although it was previously believed that Momoa and Bonet had married on November 15, 2007, the couple did not marry until October 2017. Daughter Lola Iolani was born in July, 2007. And son Nakoa-Wolf Manakauapo Namakaeha was born in December 2008. In January 2022, Momoa and Bonet announced their split.

Momoa learned martial arts for his role as Ronon in Stargate Atlantis. In 2017, Momoa started practicing Brazilian jiu-jitsu.

He is a fan of heavy metal music and has noted that he "build[s] [his] characters off of metal songs". He invited members of Archspire for cameo appearances in the first episode of the TV series See, and he also practiced proper screaming technique with the vocalist of Archspire, Oli Peters, for a significant scene in the series. On October 30, 2020, Momoa was featured in the song "Doom" by black metal band Scour. Momoa is a hobby musician and plays bass guitar, mandolin, ukulele and guitar in his spare time, the first of which he took up after listening to Tool's song "Sober".

Momoa has numerous tattoos, including a halfsleeve on his left forearm, a tribute to his family god, or "aumakua".

He participated in protests against the building of the Thirty Meter Telescope on Mauna Kea, a holy spiritual site for native Hawaiians.

Facial scar
On November 15, 2008, Momoa was slashed across the face with a broken beer glass during an altercation at the Birds Cafe, a tavern in Hollywood, California. He received approximately 140 stitches during reconstructive surgery and the scar through his left eyebrow is apparent in his later work. The assailant was sentenced to five years in prison for the attack.

Filmography

Film

Television

Awards and nominations

References

External links

 

1979 births
Living people
20th-century American male actors
21st-century American male actors
American male film actors
American male television actors
American male voice actors
American people of German descent
American people of Irish descent
American people who self-identify as being of Native American descent
American people of Native Hawaiian descent
Male actors from Hawaii
Male actors from Honolulu
Male actors from Iowa
People from Polk County, Iowa
Native Hawaiian male actors